Rodolfo Diego Flores (born 11 December 1980) is an Argentine football manager and former player who played mainly as a midfielder. He is the current manager of Godoy Cruz.

Career
Born in Córdoba, Flores only played amateur football before deciding he would become a coach at the age of 24. He began his managerial career with General Paz Juniors, later working at Taborín's youth categories and Sportivo Belgrano de Almafuerte before moving to Ireland in 2013 to study for UEFA qualifications.

While in Ireland, Flores worked as a barista in a coffeehouse and played for Dublin-based side Kingswood Castle; at the club, he also helped managing the youth teams. After leaving Ireland at the end of 2013, he moved to Southampton where he met Mauricio Pochettino, and later Marcelo Bielsa; after a chat with Diego Reyes, a member of Bielsa's staff, he was invited by Bielsa to join his coaching staff at Olympique de Marseille.

Flores worked under Bielsa for a total of seven years, at Lazio, Lille OSC and Leeds United. On 31 August 2021, he was appointed manager of Argentine Primera División side Godoy Cruz.

Flores' first professional match occurred on 5 September 2021, a 4–0 home routing of Gimnasia La Plata. The following April, he left the club on a mutual agreement.

On 3 November 2022, Flores returned to Godoy Cruz, after being appointed manager for the upcoming season.

References

External links

1980 births
Living people
Footballers from Córdoba, Argentina
Argentine footballers
Association football midfielders
Argentine football managers
Olympique de Marseille non-playing staff
S.S. Lazio non-playing staff
Lille OSC non-playing staff
Leeds United F.C. non-playing staff
Argentine Primera División managers
Godoy Cruz Antonio Tomba managers
Argentine expatriate sportspeople in Ireland
Argentine expatriate sportspeople in Italy
Argentine expatriate sportspeople in France
Argentine expatriate sportspeople in England